Edmund Burke Wood (February 13, 1820 – October 7, 1882) was a Member of the Legislative Assembly of Ontario for Brant South, and served as the first provincial treasurer of Ontario from 1867 to 1871 under Premier John Sandfield Macdonald. He also served as a federal Member of Parliament representing the electoral districts of Brant South and Durham West from 1867–1874 under Prime Minister Sir John A. Macdonald.

He later became Chief Justice of the Supreme Court of Manitoba from 1874 to 1882. He died as Chief Justice in 1882.

External links 
 
 
 

1820 births
1882 deaths
Finance ministers of Ontario
Liberal Party of Canada MPs
Members of the House of Commons of Canada from Ontario
Members of the Legislative Assembly of the Province of Canada from Canada West
Progressive Conservative Party of Ontario MPPs
Judges in Manitoba
People from Fort Erie, Ontario